Heinrich Decimator (c. 1544, Gifhorn - 1615) was a German Protestant theologian, astronomer and linguist of Mühlhausen in Thuringen. 

He was the son of the pastor Georg Decimator of Dodendorf. He studied theology until 1570 at University of Wittenberg. Then, he became a teacher in Mühlhausen. In 1579, he was ordained the pastor of Schnarsleben.

Works  

	
 — Part 1: German headwords with equivalents in Latin, Greek, Hebrew, Chaldean, and French. Part 2: Dictionary of proper Latin names, human and geographic, with equivalents in Greek and German. Part 3: Thematic dictionary with Latin headwords and equivalents in Greek, Hebrew, Chaldean, French, Italian, German, Dutch, and Spanish.
	
 — A monolingual Latin dictionary, augmented with equivalents in Greek, Hebrew, French, Italian, and German, to which is appended a compendious dictionary of Latin and Greek equivalents for German words and phrases indexed to the Latin dictionary. In all, some 1600 pages.

References 

1544 births
1615 deaths
16th-century German astronomers
17th-century German astronomers
16th-century linguists
17th-century linguists
Linguists from Germany
People from Gifhorn